Adnan Ibrahim is a Palestinian Islamic scholar who holds a masters and a PhD in Arabic studies from the University of Vienna.

Life
Adnan Ibrahim was born and brought up in a refugee camp in Gaza/Palestine. He later moved to Yugoslavia and studied medicine in Sarajevo. In the 1990s he moved to Vienna because of the Bosnian War, where he became Imam of the Shura mosque in Leopoldstadt in 2002. He holds Austrian citizenship.

His preaching in Arabic reaches a wide audience through digital media.

According to Raphael Israeli, "After the London bombings in 2005, he issued a fatwa saying Muslims who hear of plans for a terrorist attack must report them to the police immediately." He has preached and lectured against female genital mutilation.

Views

Stoning 
Ibrahim rejects the punishment of stoning for adultery. A similar opinion to this has been offered by other scholars such as Shaykh Yusuf al-Qaradawi.

Controversy
In 2007 Austrian media described him as a controversial figure: liberal in theology and opposing terrorism in Europe, his preaching on Middle Eastern politics has praised anti-Israeli militants and led to accusations of supporting Hamas against Israel. Called an "enlightened and reforming imam by one commentator, particularly with regard to women's issues," in 2014 he again reportedly preached in support of Hamas, although the accuracy of the translation was called into question.

During a speech at the Strasbourg Islamic center, a video of which was posted on the internet in January 2011 (as translated by MEMRI), Ibrahim claimed that Nicolaus Copernicus had actually stolen ideas from the Arab Islamic astronomer Abu Al-Hasan Ibn Al-Shatir. He is not the only scholar to suggest this. He also claimed that other western scientists, including Galileo Galilei, Tycho Brahe, Johannes Kepler, and Leonardo da Vinci were actually "thieves...who robbed the Islamic heritage, which was kept in the darkness of church crypts for over 200 years." Ibrahim claimed these comments were made by "a Polish prime minister" when, on a visit to Syria, supposedly admitted all of this to then president Hafez al-Assad that all of these scientists had stolen knowledge from Islamic scholars. Ibrahim also claimed that Muslim scientist Baha Al-Amili had developed a formula for "perpetual energy" and created lighting in a mosque in the city of Isfahan that burned indefinitely without any energy source.

References

External links
 YouTube https://www.youtube.com/user/shaikhAdnanIbrahim Arabic YouTube channel

1966 births
Austrian imams
Critics of atheism
Muslim reformers
21st-century Muslim scholars of Islam
Palestinian emigrants to Austria
Living people